Choristoneura colyma is a species of moth of the family Tortricidae. It is found in Jammu and Kashmir, India.

The wingspan is about 20 mm. The ground colour of the forewings is cream yellowish, the veins in the posterior third of the wing tinged with brownish. The markings are pale rust. The hindwings are cream white.

References

Moths described in 2006
Choristoneura
Moths of Asia
Taxa named by Józef Razowski